Westminster City Hall is a municipal building in Victoria Street in Westminster, London. It is the headquarters of Westminster City Council.

History

In the late 19th century the parishes of St Margaret and St John held their meetings at the old Westminster Town Hall in Caxton Street. However, after the enlarged Metropolitan Borough of Westminster was formed in 1900, civic leaders decided the Caxton Street building was inadequate for their needs, and decided to find larger facilities; they selected an existing building in Charing Cross Road which had been designed by Robert Walker and completed in 1890. The Charing Cross Road building, which adjoined the Garrick Theatre, was renamed 'Westminster City Hall' and enlarged to meet the administrative requirements of the council in 1902.

In the early 1960s, in anticipation of the impending further enlargement of the council's area, civic leaders again decided they needed larger facilities; the site they selected formed part of a larger development by Land Securities on a site previously occupied by Prince's Mansions in Victoria Street. The enlarged City of Westminster was formed in March 1965, shortly before the completion of the new town hall in April 1965.

Initially, Westminster City Council only used the 20th floor, but gradually expanded to take the whole building. The principal rooms were the Mayor's parlour on the 19th floor and the committee rooms on the 18th floor, which were used for cabinet meetings as well as committee meetings.

The building was stripped back to a concrete shell during an extensive refurbishment between 2017 and 2019.

Notes

References

Buildings and structures in the City of Westminster
City and town halls in London
Government buildings completed in 1965